Joseph H. Steele (December 13, 1836 – December 14, 1913) was an American politician and businessman from Maryland. He served as a member of the Maryland House of Delegates, representing Cecil County, in 1880.

Early life
Joseph H. Steele was born on December 13, 1836, in Chesapeake City, Maryland, to Rebecca R. (née Sharp) and George A. Steele. His father was a farmer and a carpenter. At the age of fourteen, Steele worked as a clerk in the office of George W. Bennett.

Career
Steele became a partner in Bennett's lumber and grain business. After Bennett died in 1869, Steele became the sole manager of the grain, coal, lime and phosphate business.

Steele was appointed as postmaster of Chesapeake City by President Andrew Johnson. From 1871 to 1872, Steele served as collector of taxes in Cecil County's second district. Steele was a Democrat. He served as a member of the Maryland House of Delegates, representing Cecil County, in 1880. He also served as presidential elector.

Steele served as director of the Mutual Fire Insurance Company of Cecil County for 44 years. He served as president of the organization for fifteen years, succeeding Jacob Tome. He also served as director of the Scott Fertilizer Company.

Personal life
Steele married Caradora Bouchelle, daughter of state delegate John W. Bouchelle, on January 25, 1871. They had five children, Bennett, Stanley, J. Groome, Harold and Dora B. Steele was an Episcopalian and was a vestryman of the Protestant Episcopal Church.

Steele died on December 14, 1913, at his home in Chesapeake City. He was buried at Bethel Cemetery in Chesapeake City.

References

1836 births
1913 deaths
People from Chesapeake City, Maryland
Maryland postmasters
Democratic Party members of the Maryland House of Delegates
19th-century American politicians
Episcopalians from Maryland